Integrated Engineering is a multi-disciplinary, design-project-based engineering degree program.

Integrated Engineering is a program created to meet the demand for engineers skilled in various disciplines, combining aspects from traditional engineering studies and liberal arts. The demand arises from the current state of industry, where both the products manufactured and the plants which make the products are progressing towards greater diversity and sophistication. Recent studies had shown concern in both Canada and in the United States that engineering graduates were not well-prepared for many of today's multi-disciplinary and project-based workplaces. Several committees have been formed to study this and  have published some material. One Canadian study was done by the Canadian Academy of Engineering and two of its main conclusions were:

 Engineering faculties should ensure that breadth of learning, beyond the technical aspects of the specialist engineering discipline, is a major thrust in engineering education.
 The engineering curriculum should emphasize problem-solving, design, and the development of the learning skills of their students.

Integrated Engineers acquire background in core disciplines such as: materials, solid mechanics, fluid mechanics, and systems involving chemical, electro-mechanical, and biological components.

Academia and Accreditation

Institutions
Currently, the following academic institutions are known to offer Integrated Engineering programs:

Canada
University of British Columbia
University of Western Ontario

UK
The New Model Institute for Technology and Engineering (NMITE)
University of Bath
University of Cardiff
University of Liverpool
University of Nottingham
Anglia Ruskin University
University Centre Peterborough

United States
Lafayette College
Lehigh University
Southern Utah University
Minnesota State University, Mankato

Germany
 Baden-Wuerttemberg Cooperative State University (DHBW)
 South Westphalia University of Applied Sciences

Estonia
Tallinn University of Technology

Korea
Chung-Ang University

Trinidad and Tobago
University of Trinidad and Tobago

Canada
Integrated Engineering originated at the University of Western Ontario in Ontario, Canada and in 2000 the Applied Science Faculty of the University of British Columbia also began a degree program for Integrated Engineering.

In Canada, the program has been fully accredited by the Canadian Engineering Accreditation Board and engineers are able to obtain a Professional Engineer (P.Eng) Certificate.

United Kingdom
In 1988, the Engineering Council UK, identified the need for routes to qualification for Chartered (Professional) Engineers that:

meet the identified needs of industry,
increase access to engineering education by more students,
provide a balanced curriculum combining the subjects that engineers use most often and directed towards the needs of the majority of engineers.

This is the fundamental definition for Integrated Engineering.

The qualities looked for by industry when recruiting graduates were identified as:

flexibility and broad education,
ability to understand non engineering functions,
ability to solve problems,
knowledge of the principles of engineering and ability to apply them in practical situations,
information skills,
experience of project work, especially cross linked projects,
ability to work as a member of a team,
presentation and communication skills.

Engineering Council UK, 1988, An Integrated Engineering Degree Programme.
Engineering Council UK, 1988, Admissions to Universities - Action to increase the supply of engineers.

Following open competition for additional funding provided by the UK Department for Technology and Industry, and industrial supporters including British Petroleum, six universities were selected from thirty three applicants.  Four "Pilot Programmes" were launched at Cardiff University, Nottingham Trent University, Portsmouth University and Sheffield Hallam University.

In 1989, The Nottingham Trent University (UK) admitted students to first of the Engineering Council's new Integrated Engineering Degree Programme courses.  The course was accredited, at the CEng and European Engineer level, by the Institutions of Mechanical Engineers, Electrical Engineers and Manufacturing Engineers.

Generic engineering programmes are common.  Integrated Engineering is distinct through emphasizing the development of personal competencies, especially the ability of students to work within groups.  It is design led, and integration of all the subjects of study is a defining characteristic, achieved partly through the medium of project based learning.

Following the successful experience at The Nottingham Trent University, Integrated Engineering programmes were established in 1993, at selected universities in Bulgaria and Hungary, with the aid of European Union funding granted under the Tempus Programme.

In University of Liverpool, the Integrated Engineering Program is accredited by the Institution of Mechanical Engineers and the Institution of Electrical Engineers, and can lead to Chartered Engineer status.

In Anglia Ruskin University, the Integrated Engineering Program is accredited by the Institution of Engineering and Technology, and can lead to Incorporated Engineer status.

United States
In the U.S. there are several Integrated engineering education programs.

Southern Utah University requires its students to pass the Fundamentals of Engineering exam (FE) before they graduate; and received ABET accreditation in 2004 that extended retroactively through October 2003. The graduates are also able to obtain a Professional Engineer (P.E.) license.

Minnesota State University, Mankato has developed a collaborative Integrated engineering program to provide engineering education at MNSCU Community Colleges in the Northern Higher Education District in former Iron Range communities. This partnership allows students to stay near home, while earning a bachelor of science in integrated engineering while focusing on local engineering needs of manufacturers and businesses. As part of the program students are also required to sit for the FE examination prior to graduation and are eligible to sit for the P.E. exam license as the program is also ABET accredited.

Germany
In Germany the [(Baden-Wuerttemberg Cooperative State University (DHBW))] introduced a flexible M.Eng. program in 2015, to fit to the industrial demand for generally educated engineers for Integrated Industry, known as Industry 4.0 in Germany. The graduated school program "Integrated Engineering" is administered at the Center for Advances Studies in Heilbronn and requires at least two years professional experience as an engineer for admission.

Korea
In Korea the Department of Integrative Engineering at Chung-Ang University aims to develop human resources that will contribute to building a knowledge infrastructure by effectively responding to rapid educational and social changes.

The department will focus on developing fundamental and application technologies by realizing future-oriented converging technologies and, through a global network, on strengthening convergence-related competitiveness at the university and national level. To accomplish the goals, based on imaginative education using an innovative system, the department will develop “integrative engineering” people who are equipped with initiative research abilities.

Trinidad and Tobago
The Bachelor of Applied Science (B.A.S.c) and Master of Engineering (M.Eng) programs in Utilities Engineering was validated in December 2008 at the University of Trinidad and Tobago. These programs are geared towards the Electrical and Mechanical engineering disciplines that exist within the broad area of Integrated Engineering.

Prior to the introduction of the programs most of the engineers in the utilities sector were specialized in one branch of engineering mainly Electrical or Mechanical. The sector required an engineer who was multi-skilled and versed in both disciplines. The Utilities Engineer therefore performs a wide range of maintenance and operational duties in the following industries:

Process Industry,
Electric Utilities (generation, distribution and efficient utilization),
Transportation Industry,
Processing and Manufacturing Industry,
Water and sanitation industry,
Mining and Smelting Industry,
Renewable and Green Energy Industry.

See also
 University of Western Ontario
 University of British Columbia
 Engineering Undergraduate Society of the University of British Columbia
 Southern Utah University
 Chung-Ang University

References

External links
 Southern Utah University: Integrated Engineering and Pre-Engineering
 University of British Columbia: Integrated Engineering
 University of Western Ontario: Integrated Engineering
 University of Liverpool: Integrated Engineering
 University of Windsor: Integrated Engineering
 University of Nottingham: Integrated Engineering
 Anglia Ruskin University
 University Centre Peterborough
 Chung-Ang University, Seoul, Korea: Integrative Engineering
 University of Trinidad and Tobago: Utilities Engineering

Engineering education